Edward Pheasant (15 February 1875 – 17 July 1910) was an English footballer, who played in the Football League for both Black Country clubs, Wolverhampton Wanderers and West Bromwich Albion.

Career
Pheasant began his career at local non-league club Wednesbury Excelsior (which later became Wednesbury Old Athletic) before joining First Division Wolverhampton Wanderers in August 1895. He made his league debut on 19 September 1896 in a 3–4 loss at Derby, but had to wait until the 1898–99 season to become a first choice player.

He was an ever-present for two successive seasons during 1899–1901, amassing 168 games for the club over a nine-year stay. He then moved to neighbours West Bromwich Albion in November 1904 for a £500 transfer fee and in the same month made his debut against Manchester United in a Division Two match. He appeared in 152 games for Albion in all competitions, scoring 22 goals.

The defender joined Leicester Fosse in 1910 but never played a game for them. He died of peritonitis just two weeks after signing for the club, on 17 July 1910 aged 33. (An obituary in the West Bromwich & Oldbury Chronicle, dated Friday 22 July 1910, suggests that Ted Pheasant had recently signed for Darlaston after being released by WBA. His death came about following an incident in which he strained himself playing cricket. Peritonitis set in, but unfortunately an operation to remedy this proved to be unsuccessful.)

References
General
 

Specific

1875 births
1910 deaths
English footballers
English Football League players
Wolverhampton Wanderers F.C. players
West Bromwich Albion F.C. players
Leicester City F.C. players
People from Darlaston
Wednesbury Old Athletic F.C. players
Association football defenders